The Articles of Capitulation of Montreal were agreed upon between the Governor General of New France, Pierre François de Rigaud, Marquis de Vaudreuil-Cavagnal, and Major-General Jeffery Amherst on behalf of the French and British crowns. They were signed on 8 September 1760 in the British camp before the city of Montreal, during the French and Indian War after a two-month campaign which led to the fall of the city.

There were 55 articles, including a large array of demands with regards to the protection of the inhabitants of New France: the French, the Canadians, the Acadians, and the First Nations. De Vaudreuil demanded that all be granted the rights and privileges of the other British subjects. These consisted an amnesty of Canadian militiamen who had fought for the French, the free exercise of the Roman Catholic faith, the continuation of the ownership of black and Indian slaves by French Canadians, the continuation of the rights and privileges of the clergy and seigneurs and the guarantee of the rights enjoyed by the native peoples under the French regime.  Most were granted by the British Army except those with reference to the Acadians.

Although the articles were drafted without participation from First Nations, Article 40 of the treaty recognized their sovereignty and autonomy, promising to uphold their right to their lands and religion and avoid punishment for having fought for the French.

See also

Articles of Capitulation of Quebec
Timeline of Quebec history

References

External links

Full text of the Articles of Capitulation of Montreal

New France
Battles of the French and Indian War
1760 in Canada
1760 in the French colonial empire
1760s in New France
History of Montreal
Pre-Confederation Quebec
1760 in North America
1760 in the British Empire
18th century in Montreal
18th century in Quebec
1760 documents
Surrenders